The 1973–74 National Hurling League was the 43rd season of the National Hurling League.

Division 1

Wexford came into the season as defending champions of the 1972-73 season.

On 5 May 1974, Cork won the title following a 6–15 to 1–12 win over Limerick in the final. It was their 10th league title overall and their first since 1971-72.

Dublin's Pat Quigley was the Division 1 top scorer with 2-49.

Division 1A table

Group stage

Division 1B table

Group stage

Knock-out stage

Quarter-finals

Semi-finals

Final

Scoring statistics

Top scorers overall

Top scorers in a single game

References

National Hurling League seasons
League
League